Bukhansan Bogungmun station is a station on the Ui LRT located in Jeongneung-dong, Seongbuk-gu, Seoul. It opened on September 2, 2017.

References

Seoul Metropolitan Subway stations
Railway stations opened in 2017
Metro stations in Seongbuk District